There are a number of known environmental issues in the post-communist country of Albania.  Issues include air and water pollution, poor waste management infrastructure and deforestation. The Albanian environmental movement includes around 40 active non-government organisations.

Issues

Air pollution
Air pollution is a major environmental issue in the bigger cities of Albania, especially the capital, Tirana. The sharp increase in air pollution in bigger cities resulted from a sharp increase in cars' ownership,  increasing secondary activity in the area and decrease of urban greenery.  Annual average concentrations of PM10 and NO2 in Tirana are above the limit values of  National Air Quality Standard and World Health Organization.

Water pollution
Water pollution in Albania is caused by disposal of trash, and discharge of untreated wastewater and sewage. Two rivers which pass through the capital, Tirana, are two of the most polluted rivers in Albania. Lanë and Ishëm (river) are clean at their source, but once they enter Tirana, their water is several times more polluted than allowed standards.
Industrial pollution of rivers has been observed in the rivers Shkumbini, Fani, Gjanika and Semani, where toxic organic compounds and metals from mining and industrial activity are heavily affecting these rivers.

Waste
The waste management system is composed by a weak collection systems in cities and very little collection systems in rural areas. The Albania’s collection coverage is around to 77%. Recycling is done by private companies, which employ poor people to collect plastic, metallic, glass and paper waste which is processed or packed and then sold to other countries. The rest is mostly landfilled. Awareness on waste recycling is low. Littering and dumping trash remains a serious problem for Albania.

Deforestation
Illegal logging is the main threat to Albanian forests. The other threat comes from forest fires which in the last years have intensified.

Albania had a 2018 Forest Landscape Integrity Index mean score of 6.77/10, ranking it 64th globally out of 172 countries.

Environmental movement in Albania
The environmental movement in Albania is represented by around 100 environmental non-governmental organizations (NGOs). It consists of local and national NGOs. Less than 40 NGOs are active due to lack of funding and barriers in influencing the decision makers. The main environmental organizations in Albania are Ekolëvizja, Institute for Environmental Policy in Albania, Regional Environmental Center in Albania, EDEN Center, and Millieukontakt Albania.

See also
 List of environmental issues
 Environmentalism
 Environmental racism in Europe
 List of conservation topics
 List of conservation issues
 List of environmental organizations
 Lists of environmental topics
 List of sustainability topics
 Johnathans Barbershop

References

Environment of Albania
Albania